Sugar Hill is a city in northern Gwinnett County and a suburb of Atlanta in the U.S. state of Georgia.  The population was 18,522 as of the 2010 census, making it the fourth-largest city in Gwinnett County. As of 2020, the estimated population was 23,994. It is in close proximity to Lake Lanier and the foothills of the North Georgia mountains.

History
Sugar Hill was established through a charter by the Georgia state assembly in 1939 as the Town of Sugar Hill and officially incorporated on March 24, 1939. The town was renamed the City of Sugar Hill in 1975. Before the city was incorporated, the area was part of a route from the railroad in Buford to the city of Cumming. According to tradition, the town was named after an incident where a large shipment of sugar spilled and the area became known as "the hill where the sugar spilled" or "the sugar hill".

In 2001, a drastic increase in natural gas prices, disproportionate to the cost of natural gas outside of Sugar Hill, resulted in residents forming "The Committee to Dissolve Sugar Hill", with over 1,600 residents signing a petition calling for a referendum to abolish both the municipal utility and the city itself. State senator Billy Ray proposed a bill asking for a non-binding referendum.  The bill was passed in the state senate but failed to pass in the House, and the effort to revoke the city's charter was unsuccessful. The city council responded to this effort by reducing the utility's prices to be comparable to those in the surrounding area.

Geography

Sugar Hill is located in northern Gwinnett County in northern Georgia. It is bordered to the northeast by the city of Buford and to the southwest by the city of Suwanee. Georgia State Route 20 is the main highway through the center of Sugar Hill, leading northwest  to Cumming and south  to Lawrenceville, the Gwinnett County seat. US 23 turns southeast at the Sugar Hill–Buford border and runs  with SR 20 to Interstate 985, which in turn leads northeast  to Gainesville and southwest  to downtown Atlanta.

Climate
The climate of Sugar Hill, as with most of the southeastern United States, is humid subtropical (Cfa) according to the Köppen classification with four seasons, including hot, humid summers and cool winters.

Demographics

2020 census

As of the 2020 United States census, there were 25,076 people, 7,195 households, and 5,806 families residing in the city.

2010 census
As of 2010 Sugar Hill had a population of 18,522, with 6,114 households and 4,832 families residing in the city. The racial and ethnic composition of the population was 72.4% white, 9.8% black or African American, 0.3% Native American, 1.3% Asian Indian, 5.0% other Asian, 0.1% Pacific Islander, 8.6% from some other race and 2.5% from two or more races.  19.6% of the population was Hispanic or Latino of any race.

Of the city's 6,114 households, 45.2%% had children under the age of 18 living with them, 57.9%% were married couples living together, 13.2%% had a female householder with no husband present, and 22.8% were non-familie households. 18.1% of all households were made up of individuals, and 4.2% had someone living alone who was 65 years of age or older.  The average household size was 3.06	and the average family size was 3.46.

The median income for a household in the city was $70,106, and the median income for a family was $75,473. Males had a median income of $53,890 versus $37,991 for females. The per capita income for the city was $27,119.  About 9.3% of families and 12.4% of the population were below the poverty line, including 17.4% of those under age 18 and 4.0% of those age 65 or over.

After the 2000 census the city's growth was ranked 75 out of the 100 highest growing cities in the nation, and one of the 20 fastest growing in the state of Georgia and is Gwinnett County's fourth-largest city by population.  Sugar Hill was the third-largest city in Gwinnett County until Peachtree Corners became a city on July 1, 2012.

Economy
Sugar Hill, as with the rest of Gwinnett County, has a sales tax of 6%, which comprises the 4% state sales tax and a 2% local tax.

On April 28, 2011, Governor Nathan Deal signed legislation that allowed individual local communities to vote on whether to allow alcohol sales on Sundays, which had previously been prohibited by the Georgia General Assembly since the 1800s.  A total of 97 cities and counties in Georgia held referendums on November 8, 2011, including Sugar Hill.  The Sugar Hill city council voted to allow Sugar Hill residents vote on the issue and on November 15, 2011, Sugar Hill became one of several cities that voted to allow Sunday sales of alcohol.  In 2012, the remaining areas of Gwinnett County that did not hold November 8 referendums voted to allow Sunday sales.  Supporters of the proposal to allow Sunday sales of alcohol argued that doing so would help the economy.

Government
The City of Sugar Hill is governed by a mayor and five member city council, with one councilman acting as mayor pro tempore.

When Sugar Hill was established in 1939, the town charter called for a mayor and five city councilmen, and that these elected officials were to be elected every two years.  An amendment to the town's charter in 1952 changed the election process so that the mayor and three members of the town council are elected on even years for a term of two years, and two other members of the council are elected on odd years for a term of two years.  In 1975, when the new charter was enacted that reincorporated the Town of Sugar Hill as the City of Sugar Hill, it added the requirement that a councilmen be appointed as mayor pro tempore, and retained the election method established in 1952.

The city's budget in 2012 was $28.2 million, and in 2013 was $19.4 million.  In 2010 Sugar Hill approved the process of constructing a larger city hall to accommodate for the city's increase in population.  The new city hall was completed and opened in January 2013.

Sugar Hill is part of Georgia's 7th congressional district  The city is part of the Georgia State Senate's 45th district, and the 97th, 98th, and 102nd districts for the Georgia House of Representatives.

Education
Gwinnett county operates Gwinnett County Public Schools for K-12 students living in Sugar Hill. Sugar Hill Elementary, White Oak Elementary, Sycamore Elementary, Lanier Middle School and Lanier High School are the public schools serving the city of Sugar Hill residents. Portions of Sugar Hill also fall under the North Gwinnett district, encompassing Riverside Elementary, North Gwinnett Middle School, and North Gwinnett High School.

Gwinnett County Public Library operates the Buford-Sugar Hill Branch in Buford.

Media

As part of the Metro Atlanta area, Sugar Hill's primary network-affiliated television stations are WXIA-TV (NBC), WANF (CBS), WSB-TV (ABC), and WAGA-TV (Fox). WGTV is the local station of the statewide Georgia Public Television network and is a PBS member station.

Sugar Hill is served by the Gwinnett Daily Post, which is the most widely distributed newspaper in Sugar Hill as well as Gwinnett county's legal organ.  The Atlanta Journal-Constitution is also distributed in Sugar Hill.  The weekly Gwinnett Herald served Sugar Hill from 1871 until 1885.

Infrastructure

Roads and freeways
Sugar Hill's major road is State Route 20, which travels through Sugar Hill in a general northwest-southeast direction, going southeast into the adjoining city of Buford and northwest into Forsyth County.  The nearest interstates are I-985 and I-85, which are both accessible via State Route 20 in Buford.

Pedestrians and cycling
Sugar Hill Greenway (Under construction)
Western Gwinnett Bikeway (Under construction)

Utilities
The city is a member of the Municipal Gas Authority of Georgia and manages the Sugar Hill Gas Department which provides natural gas for the city's residents.

Notable people
 Kurt Johnson, former NHRA pro stock driver and 1993 NHRA Rookie of the Year
 Warren Johnson, former NHRA pro stock driver and six-time NHRA pro stock Champion
 Daryl Mitchell, television and movie actor
 Derrick Brown, NFL football player
 Zack Calzada, College football player

References

External links

 City of Sugar Hill official website

Cities in Georgia (U.S. state)
Cities in Gwinnett County, Georgia